Antonio Rangel may refer to:

Antonio Rangel (badminton), Mexican badminton player
Antonio Rangel (footballer), Spanish footballer